Rihanna 777 Documentary... 7Countries7Days7Shows is the third live long-form video by Barbadian singer Rihanna. It was released on May 7, 2013 by Def Jam Recordings. An edited version aired on May 6 on the Fox Network. It features behind-the-scene look of the singer's 777 Tour, a seven-date tour where she performed seven concerts in seven cities in seven countries accompanied with a group of fans and more than 150 journalists to promote her seventh studio album Unapologetic (2012).

Background 

Rihanna began "working on the new sound" for her seventh studio album in March 2012, even though she had not yet begun recording. On September 12, 2012, Def Jam France announced via Twitter that Rihanna would release a new single the upcoming week while her seventh studio album was scheduled to be released in November 2012. However, the tweet was shortly deleted and replaced with another clarifying that more information will available the next day (September 13). Via her official Twitter account, Rihanna posted series of "teasing" tweets announcing her seventh studio album. On October 11, 2012, in one of her tweets revealed that the title of her new album is Unapologetic along with its cover.

To further promote Unapologetic, on November 14, 2012, Rihanna embarked on a seven-date promotional tour entitled 777 Tour. She performed seven concerts each in a different city in North America and Europe in seven days to promote the release of the album. The tour was promoted and supported by HTC Corporation; during the 777 tour, Rihanna was joined by elite group of fans and 150 journalists which represented 82 countries. They flew with the singer aboard a chartered Boeing 777 twinjet to every venue she visited during the course of the tour. The 777 Tour started on November 14 in Mexico City and continued on November 15 in Toronto, November 16 in Stockholm, November 17 in Paris, November 18 in Berlin, November 19 in London and ended on November 20 in New York City.

Following its end, the tour was met with criticism from the journalists accompanying Rihanna. Although they found it innovative and interesting, they criticized the concerts and travel delays and Rihanna's non-presence on the parties held on the jet. In an interview with BBC Radio 1, the singer clarified her absence from the parties and said that it was a result of her resting so she could save her voice for the shows, "They all want you to host a party every time you get on the plane after a show but you really only have that time to sleep until you get to the next country... Sometimes it was a two-hour ride to the next country and that was all the sleep you would get." Despite the criticism, following the end of the 777 Tour, both Unapologetic and the lead single "Diamonds" reached number one on the US Billboard 200 and Hot 100 charts respectively.

Release 

The documentary was announced on March 19, 2013. On April 4, the first official trailer for the documentary was released. The preview shows Rihanna boarding on a plane and also later preparing for a show along with the tagline, "One woman takes on the world". A second trailer was released on April 16, on Rihanna's official website. It features the captain of the jet talking, the singer and her crew preparing for the shows, and intercuted scenes on the jet of the journalists and fans. Rihanna 777 aired on May 6 on Fox Network in the United States. Apart of that, on April 23 Roc Nation announced that the film will be released in DVD format and will feature several performances of Rihanna's songs including "Diamonds" and "Stay". Rihanna 777 in DVD format was released on May 7 in Australia, Canada, Germany, Italy, Japan, Spain, Sweden and the United States, on May 10 in the Netherlands and Poland and on June 3 in France.

Setlist 

 "Cockiness (Love It)"
 "Birthday Cake" (Remix) 
 "Talk That Talk"
 "Wait Your Turn"
 "Man Down"  
 "Only Girl (In the World)"
 "Don't Stop the Music"
 "S&M"
 "Phresh Out the Runway"
 "Unfaithful"
 "Take a Bow"
 "Hate That I Love You"
 "Where Have You Been" (contains excerpts of "Take Care")
 "Run This Town" (JAY-Z cover) 
 "Live Your Life" (T.I. cover) 
 "All of the Lights" (Kanye West cover)
 "Love the Way You Lie" (Eminem cover)
 "Stay"
 "Diamonds"
 "Umbrella"
 "We Found Love"

Charts

Certifications

Release history

References

External links 
Official trailer on YouTube

Rihanna video albums
Live video albums
2013 video albums